The Diocese of San Vicente del Caguán, shortened to the Diocese of San Vicente, is a Latin Church ecclesiastical territory or diocese of the Catholic Church in Colombia. It is a suffragan diocese in the ecclesiastical province of the metropolitan Archdiocese of Florencia.
 
The diocesan cathedra, the Catedral Nuestra Señora de las Mercedes, is located in the episcopal see of San Vicente del Caguán in Caqueta Department.

History 
On 9 December 1985, pope John Paul II established the Apostolic Vicariate of San Vicente-Puerto Leguízamo from the Apostolic Vicariate of Florencia (now a bishopric).
 
Pope Benedict XVI split the vicariate in two on 21 February 2013, creating the Apostolic Vicariate of San Vicente del Caguán and the Apostolic Vicariate of Puerto Leguízamo-Solano.

On 30 May 2019 Pope Francis elevated this Apostolic Vicariate in the rank of diocese. On 13 July 2019 the new created diocese changed province from Ibagué to Florencia

Ordinaries 
(All members of the Consolata Missionaries)
 Apostolic Vicars
 Luis Augusto Castro Quiroga, I.M.C. (17 Oct. 1986 – 2 Feb. 1998), Titular Bishop of Aquæ Flaviæ
 Francisco Javier Múnera Correa, I.M.C. (1998.11.28 – 2019.05.30), Titular Bishop of Aquæ novæ in Numidia
  Diocesan Bishops of San Vicente del Caguán
 Francisco Javier Múnera Correa, I.M.C. (30 May 2019–present)

See also 
 Roman Catholicism in Colombia

Notes

External links 
 GigaCatholic with incumbent biography links

Roman Catholic dioceses in Colombia
Roman Catholic Ecclesiastical Province of Florencia
Christian organizations established in 1985
1985 establishments in Colombia